Lieutenant General Praveen Bakshi PVSM, AVSM, VSM, ADC was the 25th General Officer-Commanding-in-Chief Eastern Command of the Indian Army and assumed office on 1 August 2015 after Lieutenant General Man Mohan Singh Rai. He retired on 31 July 2017 and was succeeded by Lieutenant General Abhay Krishna. Prior, he was chief of staff of the Northern Command based at Udhampur. He succeeded Lt Gen Man Mohan Singh Rai who is appointed as the Vice Chief of Army Staff at the Headquarter of Indian Army in New Delhi.

Education
He is an alumnus of National Defence Academy, Pune. He has also attended the staff college course at Defence Services Staff College, Wellington; senior command course at Army War College, Mhow and higher command course at National Defence College, New Delhi.

Career
He was commissioned into the Skinner's Horse regiment on 17 December 1977. He has vast experience headed several formations of Indian Army including an armored brigade in the western sector, a division in Rajasthan and a corps in Punjab and Jammu & Kashmir. On being promoted to the rank of Lieutenant General, he was appointed as the commander of IX Corps (Dharamshala) and later as the Chief of Staff, Northern Command based. He took charge as the GOC-in-C of the Eastern Command on 1 August 2015. He has also served in Tanzania among other places. He was also the Colonel of Skinner's Horse, 18 Cavalry and 57 Armoured Regiment

During his career spanning over decades, he was awarded the Param Vishisht Seva Medal (January 2017), Ati Vishisht Seva Medal (January 2015) and Vishisht Seva Medal (January 2013) for his service.

Awards

References

Year of birth missing (living people)
Living people
Indian generals
Recipients of the Param Vishisht Seva Medal
Recipients of the Vishisht Seva Medal
National Defence Academy (India) alumni
National Defence College, India alumni
Recipients of the Ati Vishisht Seva Medal
Army War College, Mhow alumni
Defence Services Staff College alumni